Parliamentary elections were held in the Slovak Socialist Republic on 22 and 23 October 1976 alongside national elections. All 150 seats in the National Council were won by the National Front.

Results

References

1976 in Slovakia
Parliamentary elections in Slovakia
Legislative elections in Czechoslovakia
Slovakia
One-party elections
October 1976 events in Europe
Election and referendum articles with incomplete results